Peter Birrel Cohen (19 July 1935 – 23 June 2004) was an English actor who played numerous parts on British television for nearly forty years. He appeared in the Doctor Who story Frontier in Space in 1973, as well as in the documentary I Was a 'Doctor Who' Monster. He also appeared in the first series of Alexander the Greatest. His film credits included Freelance (1971), Arch of Triumph (1984), and the television miniseries Freud (1984), War and Remembrance (1988) and Around the World in 80 Days (1989). In 1979 he played a guest-role in George and Mildred as George's brother Charlie Roper in the episode A Military Pickle.

He married actress Stephanie Cole in 1998. She was widowed by his death from cancer in Bath, aged 68 in 2004.

Filmography

References

External links

1935 births
2004 deaths
English male television actors
Deaths from cancer in England
Jewish English male actors
English Jews